Arnold Henry Guyot (September 28, 1807February 8, 1884) was a Swiss-American geologist and geographer.

Early life
Guyot was born on September 28, 1807, at Boudevilliers, near Neuchâtel, Switzerland. He was educated at Chaux-de-Fonds, then at the college of Neuchâtel. In 1825, he went to Germany and resided in Karlsruhe where he met Louis Agassiz, the beginning of a lifelong friendship. From Karlsruhe he moved to Stuttgart, where he studied at the gymnasium. He returned to Neuchâtel in 1827. He determined to enter the ministry and started at the University of Berlin to attend lectures. While pursuing his studies, he also attended lectures on philosophy and natural science. His leisure time was spent in collecting shells and plants, and he received an entrée to the Berlin Botanical Garden from Humboldt. In 1835, he received the degree of PhD from Berlin.

Scientific career
In 1838, at Agassiz's suggestion, he visited the Swiss glaciers and communicated the results of his six-week investigation to the Geological Society of France. He was the first to point out certain important observations relating to glacial motion and structure. Among other things he noted the more rapid flow of the center than of the sides, and the more rapid flow of the top than of the bottom of glaciers; described the laminated or ribboned structure of the glacial ice; and ascribed the movement of glaciers to a gradual molecular displacement rather than to a sliding of the ice mass as held by de Saussure. He subsequently collected important data concerning erratic boulders.

In 1839, he became the colleague of Agassiz as professor of history and physical geography at the College of Neuchâtel (a.k.a. Neuchâtel Academy). The suspension of that institution in 1848 caused Guyot to emigrate, at Agassiz's instance, to the United States, where he settled in Cambridge, Massachusetts. He delivered a course of lectures at the Lowell Institute which were afterward published as Earth and Man (Boston 1849). For several years the Massachusetts Board of Education retained his services as a lecturer on geography and methods of instruction to the normal schools and teachers' institutes.

He was occupied with this work until his appointment, in 1854, as professor of physical geography and geology at Princeton University, which office he retained until his death. He was also for several years lecturer on physical geography in the State Normal School in Trenton, New Jersey, and from 1861 to 1866 lecturer in the Princeton Theological Seminary. He also gave courses in the Union Theological Seminary, New York, and at Columbia College. He founded the museum at Princeton (now closed), many of the specimens of which came from his own collections. 

He was elected as a member to the American Philosophical Society in 1867.

His scientific work in the United States included the perfection of plans for a national system of meteorological observations. Most of these were conducted under the auspices of the Smithsonian Institution. His extensive meteorological observations led to the establishment of the United States Weather Bureau, and his Meteorological and Physical Tables (1852, revised ed. 1884) were long standard.

A guyot, also known as a tablemount, is an isolated underwater volcanic  mountain (seamount), with a flat top over 200 metres (660 feet) below the surface of the sea. The diameters of these flat summits can exceed . The term "guyot" was coined by Harry Hammond Hess and named after the eponymous building on Princeton University campus, itself named after Arnold Guyot.

Guyot rejected Darwin's theory of human evolution and, at the same time, he accepted Hugh Miller's views on the book of Genesis, thinking that the days described there might have taken a longer period of time. Scientist James Dwight Dana described Guyot as "a fervently religious man, living as if ever in communion with his Heavenly Parent; a Christian, following closely in the footsteps of his Master."

Guyot's Creation, or the Biblical Cosmogony in the Light of Modern Science (1884) was critically reviewed in the Science journal.

Contributions to scientific racism 
Arnold Guyot's lecture series (published as Earth and Man) describes how geography, particularly the distribution of continents, topography, and climate regions, determines the superiority or inferiority of human races in terms of beauty, physical ability, intelligence, and morality.

Through these lectures, Guyot promulgated theories of scientific racism to a wide audience in New England, including the general public and teachers who were eager to incorporate this material into their classes. Guyot is estimated to have reached about 1500 teachers during this tour.

Writings
His graded series of text books and wall maps were important aids in the extension and popularization of geological study in America. In addition to text books, his principal publications were:
Earth and Man, Lectures on Comparative Physical Geography in its Relation to the History of Mankind (translated by Cornelius Conway Felton, 1849)
A Memoir of Louis Agassiz (1883)
Creation, or the Biblical Cosmogony in the Light of Modern Science (1884)
Johnson's New Universal Cyclopaedia (1876) - editor-in-chief along with Frederick Augustus Porter Barnard

Namesakes
He is the namesake of several geographical features, including Guyot Glacier in Alaska, The Guyot Crater, Mount Guyot on the North Carolina and Tennessee border, a Mount Guyot in New Hampshire, a Mount Guyot on the Rocky Mountain Continental Divide in Colorado, as well as a Mount Guyot just southwest of Mt. Whitney, in California. The building housing the Department of Ecology and Evolutionary Biology and the Department of Geosciences at Princeton is named Guyot Hall in his honor.

Death
Guyot died on February 8, 1884, at Princeton, New Jersey.

Notes

References
 James Dwight Dana's Memoir in the Biographical Memoirs of the National Academy of Science, vol. ii. (Washington, 1886).

External links
 Tables, Meteorological and Physical Prepared for the Smithsonian Institution (1858)
 Tables, Meteorological and Physical Prepared for the Smithsonian Institution (1884)
 Directions for meteorological observations, and the registry of periodical phenomena (1860)
 Physical Geography (1873)
The earth and man: lectures on comparative physical geography, in its relation to the history of mankind (1860).
National Academy of Sciences Biographical Memoir

1807 births
1884 deaths
American geographers
19th-century American geologists
American Christian creationists
Swiss geographers
19th-century Swiss geologists
Swiss Christians
Swiss emigrants to the United States
Humboldt University of Berlin alumni
Princeton University faculty
Members of the American Philosophical Society
Members of the United States National Academy of Sciences